Grains of Paradise is a 2001 album by cellist Erik Friedlander which was released on the Tzadik label.

Reception

The Allmusic review by Thom Jurek awarded the album 4 stars stating "Fans of Friedlander's earlier work may at first be put off by all the violins, but those willing to offer a second listen will be taken by the sheer generosity of the vision and the expansive artfulness on display here compositionally. Wonderful".

Track listing
All compositions by Erik Friedlander
 "Zahtar" – 3:39  
 "Na'Na'" – 4:40  
 "Shamir" – 6:22  
 "Tapuz" – 3:35  
 "Rashad" – 6:09  
 "Aley Dafna" – 3:53  
 "Batzal" – 7:42  
 "Tziporen" – 8:33  
 "Grains of Paradise" – 5:14

Personnel
Erik Friedlander – cello
Joyce Hammann, Karen Milne, Peter Rovit – violin 
Bryce Dessner – guitar
Trevor Dunn – bass
Satoshi Takeishi – percussion

References 

2001 albums
Erik Friedlander albums
Tzadik Records albums